The Ukrainian Air Defence Forces (Viyska PPO) were an anti-aircraft military service of Ukraine, active from 1992 to 2004.

They were established on the basis of the former Soviet 8th Air Defence Army, and the last commander of that army, Lieutenant General Mikhail Lopatin, became the first commander of the Ukrainian Air Defence Forces.

History 
From January 24, 1992, after the collapse of the USSR, 28th Air Defense Corps, previously subordinate to 2nd Air Defence Army was transferred under the 8th Air Defence Army of Ukraine. Units stationed in Moldova were transferred to the Moldovan Armed Forces (275th Guards Anti-Aircraft Rocket Brigade, battalions and companies from the 14th Radio-Technical Brigade). 

There were approximately 67,000 air defense troops in Ukraine in 1992. The new Air Defence Forces headquarters was formed on the basis of the HQ 8th Air Defence Army.  There were three air defence corps: the 28th (Lviv), 49th (Odesa), and 60th (Dnipropetrovsk). All three air defence corps were taken over by Ukraine on 1 February 1992. The 28th ADC became the Western AD Region on 1 June 1992.

The Military Balance 95/96 said that six fighter regiments had been disbanded. (p. 71)

After the accidental shooting down of Siberia Airlines Flight 1812 in October 2001, the commander of the Ukrainian Air Defence Forces, Colonel general Volodymyr Tkachov, first offered to resign and then was dismissed from his post. An anti-aircraft exercise being run from a training area in the Crimea had gone wrong, and a surface-to-air missile destroyed the plane.

In 2004, the Air Defence Forces were amalgamated with the Ukrainian Air Force, becoming the Anti-Air Defence Missile Artillery of the Ukrainian Air Force. The merger of the services thus enabled the Armed Forces of Ukraine to adopt the tri-service structure, common to most modern armed forces in the world, in a historic break with the Soviet precedence. In that capacity as a speciality of the force, Ukrainian Air Defense became involved in the long Russo-Ukrainian War from the 2010s and onward. The modern day AADMA-AF reports as a operating service arm under the office of the Commander of the Air Force with units operating all over the country.

Units in the early 1990s 
The first issue of the International Institute for Strategic Studies' Military Balance after the Soviet collapse, 1992–93, listed one Air Defence army, 270 combat aircraft, and seven regiments of Su-15s (80), MiG-23s (110) and MiG-25s (80). By March 1994 Air Forces Monthly reported three air defence regions: 
 the Southern with the 62nd and 737th Fighter Aviation Regiments, 
 the Western with the 92nd (transferred from 14th Air Army and based at Mukachevo), 179th, and 894th Fighter Aviation Regiments (from 28th AD Corps/2nd Air Defence Army), 
 the Central with the 146th (Vasylkiv), 636th (Kramatorsk, disbanded in 1996 and its Su-15s broken up for scrap), and 933rd Fighter Aviation Regiments. 

Аt the time of the formation of the Air Defence Forces of Ukraine, the ADF-UKR was organized into:

General Command of the Air Defence Forces of Ukraine (Kyiv)
 228th Separate Mixed Air Regiment (Kyiv-Zhuliany), the liaison unit of the service, flying An-26, An-24 and Mi-8
 ATC and radar units supporting the flights of the fighter aviation:
 radiotechnical battalions (ртб): Belbek, Ay-Petri, Kramatorsk, Dnipropetrovsk-Kaydaki, Zaporozhye, Ozernoe, Vasilkiv, Striy, Kerch, Uman, Uzhhorod, Vladymyr-Volynsky, Kotovsk, Izmayl, Chernivtsi, Kamenka-Bugskaya
 separate radiotechnical companies (орлр): Tarkhankut, Feodosiya, Poltava, Melitopol, Vinnytsia, Popelnya, Limanskoye, Zmiyinyy 
 28th Corps of Air Defence (Lviv)
 38th Communications Center (Lviv)
 17th EW Battalion
 894th Fighter Aviation Regiment AD (Ozerne Air Base), flying MiG-23ML/MLD/UB
 179th Fighter Aviation Regiment AD (Striy Air Base), flying MiG-23MLD (until 1988 an Air Forces fighter-bomber regiment)
 254th Missile Air Defence Regiment (Mukachevo)
 270th Missile Air Defence Regiment (Striy)
 438th Missile Air Defence Regiment (Kovel')
 521st Missile Air Defence Regiment (Borshchiv)
 540th Missile Air Defence Regiment (Kamenka-Buzka)
 1st Radiotechnical Brigade (Lipniki)
 49th Corps of Air Defence (Kyiv), formed in 1989 from the 9th, 11th and 19th AD divisions.
 Separate Transport Air Detachment (Dnipropetrovsk-Kaydaki Airfield), flying An-26 and Mi-8
 146th Guards Fighter Aviation Regiment AD (Vasilkiv Air Base), flying 41 MiG-25PD
 636th Fighter Aviation Regiment AD (Kramatorsk Air Base), flying 39 Su-15TM
 933rd Fighter Aviation Regiment AD (Dnipropetrovsk-Kaydaki Air Base), flying 40 MiG-25PDS/PU (disbanded in 1996)
 96th Missile Air Defence Brigade (Vasilkiv)
 148th Missile Air Defence Brigade (Kharkiv)
 212th Missile Air Defence Brigade (Mariupol)
 138th Missile Air Defence Regiment (Dnipropetrovsk)
 276th Missile Air Defence Regiment (Svitlovodsk)
 317th Missile Air Defence Regiment (Luhansk)
 392nd Guards Missile Air Defence Regiment (Uman)
 508th Missile Air Defence Regiment (Donetsk)
 613th Missile Air Defence Regiment (Kriviy Rih)
 138th Radiotechnical Brigade (Vasilkiv)
 164th Radiotechnical Brigade (Kharkiv)
 60th Corps of Air Defence (Odesa), formed in 1989 from the 1st and 21st AD divisions.
 Separate Transport Air Detachment (Odesa-Shkolniy Airfield), flying An-26 and Mi-8
 62nd Fighter Aviation Regiment AD (Belbek Air Base), flying Su-27P and Su-15TM
 737th Fighter Aviation Regiment AD (Chervonoglinskaya-Artsiz Air Base), flying MiG-23MLD (came from Afghanistan, disbanded in 1990)
 738th Fighter Aviation Regiment AD (Zaporizhzhia-Mokre Air Base), flying MiG-25PDS (disbanded in 1990, aircraft transferred to the 152nd FAR AD at Ak-Tepe Air Base, Turkmenistan SSR)
 100th Missile Air Defence Brigade (Zaporizhzhia)
 160th Missile Air Defence Brigade (Odesa)
 174th Missile Air Defence Brigade (Sevastopol)
 208th Guards Missile Air Defence Brigade (Kherson)
 1014th Guards Missile Air Defence Regiment (Feodosiya)
 1170th Missile Air Defence Regiment (Mykolaiv)
 14th Radiotechnical Brigade (Odesa)
 16th Radiotechnical Brigade (Sevastopol)

Current organization as branch of the Air Force 
 Under Air Command West:
 11th Anti-Aircraft Missile Regiment, Shepetivka (Buk-M1)
 223rd Anti-Aircraft Missile Regiment, Stryi (Buk-M1)
 540th Anti-Aircraft Missile Regiment, Kamianka-Buzka (S-300PS)
 1st Radio-technical Brigade, Lypnyky
 17th Electronic Warfare Battalion
 Under Air Command Central:
 96th Anti-aircraft Missile Brigade, Danylivka (S-300PS)
 156th Anti-aircraft Missile Regiment, Zolotonosha (Buk-M1)
 201st Anti-aircraft Missile Regiment
138th Radio-technical Brigade, Vasylkiv
 Under Air Command East:
138th Anti-aircraft Missile Brigade, Dnipro (S-300PS)
3020th Anti-aircraft Missile Battalions Group
 301st Anti-aircraft Missile Regiment, Nikopol (S-300PS)
 164th Radio-technical Brigade, Kharkiv
2215th Radio-technical Battalion, Avdiivka
2315th Radio-technical Battalion, Rohan
2316th Radio-technical Battalion, Zaporizhzhia
2323rd Radio-technical Battalion, Mariupol
 Under Air Command South (includes Russian-controlled Task Force Crimea):
160th Anti-aircraft Missile Brigade, Odesa (S-300PM)
 208th Anti-aircraft Missile Brigade, Kherson (S-300PS)
 201st Anti-aircraft Missile Regiment, Pervomaisk (S-300PS)
 14th Radio-technical Brigade, Odesa
 Radio-technical Battalion, Kherson
 Radio-technical Battalion, Podilsk
 1194th Electronic Warfare Battalion
 174th Anti-Aircraft Artillery regiment (Derhachi near Sevastopol. S-400)
 50th Anti-Aircraft Artillery regiment (Feodosiya. S-400)
 55th Anti-Aircraft Artillery regiment (Yevpatoriya. Buk-M1)
 Directly reporting air defense formations
 19th Radio Intercept and ELINT Regiment (Special Purpose) 
 20th Special Signals and Radio-technical Equipment Repair Center

Current and historical equipment 
Currently in service in the Air Force Anti-Air Missile Defense Forces including those inherited from the Ukrainian ADF:

 9K35 Strela-10, 9K330 Tor tracked mobile anti-air defense short range surface-to-air missile launchers
 9K33 Osa wheeled mobile anti-air defense short range surface-to-air missile launchers
 Crotale R440 truck-towed anti-air defense short range surface-to-air missile launchers
 S-125 Neva/Pechora truck mounted anti-air defense short range surface-to-air missile launchers
 S-125 Newa SC tracked anti-air defense short range surface-to-air missile launchers
 2K12 Kub, Buk-M1 tracked mobile anti-air defense medium range surface-to-air missile launchers
 MIM-23 Hawk, NASAMS, IRIS-T, Pantsir-S1, Aspide truck-mounted mobile anti-air defense medium range surface-to-air missile launchers
 S-300PS, S-300 PM/PMU truck-mounted mobile anti-air defense long range surface-to-air missile launchers
 ZSU-23-4 Shilka, Flakpanzer Gepard tracked armoured short range self-propelled anti-aircraft guns
 KS-30, AZP S-60, ZU-23-2, ZPU series, Zastava M55 towed or truck mounted short range anti-aircraft guns for defense of air force bases and installations

Retired from both the Ukrainian ADF and/or the Air Force:

 S-75 Dvina, S-200 truck-towed anti-air defense long range surface-to-air missile launchers
 2K11 Krug tracked mobile anti-air defense medium range surface-to-air missile launchers

Future purchases by the Air Force Anti-Air Defense:

 MIM-104 Patriot truck-mounted anti-air defense medium/long range surface-to-air missile launchers
 SAMP-T Eurosam Aster-30 Mamba truck-mounted anti-air defense medium/long range surface-to-air missile launchers 
 Skyshield fixed or truck-mounted mobile short range anti-aircraft guns  for defense of air force bases and installations 
 RIM-7 Sea Sparrow tracked or truck mounted anti-air defense short range surface-to-air missile launchers, the former mounted on Buk chassis
 Bofors 40 mm Automatic Gun L/70 towed or truck mounted short range anti-aircraft guns, can also be operated on fixed sites for defense of air force bases and installations 

Retired aircraft of the Ukrainian ADF:

 Sukhoi Su-15, Mikoyan-Gurevich MiG-23, Mikoyan-Gurevich MiG-25, Sukhoi Su-27 fighters
 Antonov An-24, Antonov An-26 transport aircraft
 Mil Mi-8 transport and air reconnisance helicopters

Commanders
 1992 – 1996 Lieutenant General Mykhaylo Oleksiyovych Lopatin
 1996 – 2000 Lieutenant General Oleksandr Oleksiyovych Stetsenko
 2000 – 2001 Colonel General Volodymyr Vasylyovych Tkachov
 2001 – 2004 Colonel General Anatoliy Yakovych Toropchyn

References

Air Defence Forces
Air defence forces
Aviation history of Ukraine
Air Defence Forces
Organizations established in 1992
Organizations disestablished in 2004
1992 establishments in Ukraine
2004 disestablishments in Ukraine
Defunct organizations based in Ukraine